Miss World 2001, the 51st edition of the Miss World pageant, was held on 16 November 2001 at the Super Bowl of Sun City Entertainment Centre in Sun City, South Africa. 93 contestants from all over the world competed for the title. Priyanka Chopra of India crowned her successor Agbani Darego of Nigeria at the end of the event. This is the first time Nigeria won the title of Miss World.

The Miss World 2001 contest was originally set to be held in Durban.

Results

Placements

Continental Queens of Beauty

Order of Announcements

 Top 10

 Top 5

Contestants

  – Cherrisse Wood
  – Adalgisa Alexandra da Rocha Gonçalves
  – Janelle Williams
  – Virginia di Salvo
  – Zizi Lee
  – Eva Milic
  – Daniela Rockenschaub
  – Tabassum Ferdous Shaon
  – Stephanie Chase
  – Dina Tersago
  – Claudia Ettmüller
  – Ana Mirjana Račanović
  – Masego Sebedi
  – Joyce Yara Aguiar
  – Melinda McGlore
  – Stanislava Karabelova
  – Tara Hall
  – Shannon McLean
  – Christianne Balmelli Fournier
  – Bing Li
  – Jeisyl Amparo Vélez Giraldo
  – Piarella Peralta Rodríguez
  – Rajna Raguž
  – Christiana Aristotelous
  – Andrea Fiserova
  – Jeimy Castillo Molina
  – Carla Lorena Revelo Pérez
  – Sally Kettle
  – Liina Helstein
  – Jenni Dahlman
  – Emmanuelle Chossat
  – Adina Wilhelmi
  – Selasi Kwawu
  – Luann Richardson
  – Valentini Daskaloudi
  – Olive Gopaul
  – Radasha Hoʻohuli
  – Irena Pantelic
  – Gigi Chung Pui Chi
  – Zsoka Kapocs
  – Kolbrún Pálina Helgadóttir
  – Sara Corner
  – Catrina Supple
  – Karen Shlimovich
  – Paola d'Antonino
  – Regina Beavers
  – Yuka Hamano
  – Daniella Kimaru
  – Seo Hyun-jin
  – Dina Kalandārova
  – Christina Sawaya
   – Sandra Spašovska
  – Tassiana Boba
  – Elizabeth Pullu
  – Sasha Tan Hwee Teng
  – Christine Camilleri
  – Tatiana Rodríguez
  – Michelle Heitha
  – Amie Hewitt
  – Ligia Cristina Argüello
  – Agbani Darego
  – Angela McCarthy
  – Malin Johansen
  – Lourdes González Montenegro
  – Viviana Rivasplata
  – Gilrhea Castañeda Quinzon
  – Joanna Drozdowska
  – Claudia Jesus Lopez Borges
  – Bárbara Serrano Negrón
  – Vanda Petre
  – Irina Kovalenko
  – Juliet-Jane Horne
  – Angelina Johnson
  – Jana Ivanova
  – Rebeka Dremelj
  – Jo-Ann Strauss
  – Macarena García Naranjo
  – Genesis Romney
  – Camilla Maria Bäck
  – Mascha Santschi
  – Teriitamihau Rava Nui
  – Happiness Mageese
  – Lada Engchawadechasilp
  – Sacha Hill
  – Tuğçe Kazaz
  – Victoria Kabuye
  – Oleksandra Nikolayenko
  – Carrie Stroup
  – María Daniela Abásolo Cugnetti
  – Andreína Prieto
  – Charlotte Faichney
  – Tijana Stajšić
  – Nokhuthula Mpuli

Notes

Debuts

Returns

Last competed in 1959:
 
Last competed in 1991:
 
Last competed in 1994:
 
Last competed in 1996:
 
Last competed in 1997:
 
Last competed in 1998:
 
Last competed in 1999:

Withdrawals

  - Miss Teen Bahamas 2001, Kiara Sherman had to cancel her participation in Miss World 2001 due to lack of time and preparation, and because she wasn't the official winner. However 8 years later, she represented the Bahamas at Miss Universe 2009.
   - Miss Belarus 2000, Anna Stychinskaya did not compete due underage and lack of interest. No runner ups from Miss Belarus 2000 pageant were send inserted.
  - Also pulled out due to economic problems.
  - Miss Denmark 2001, Maj Petersen did not compete due to Sponsorship problems. Went to Miss World 2003 instead.
  - Miss Kazakhstan 2001, Gulmira Makhambetova did not compete for unknown reasons.
  - Did not compete because of a scheduling conflict with the Miss Lithuania 2001 contest, which was held 7 days before the Miss World 2001 finals.
  - Miss Moldova 2001, Nadezhda Corcimari was supposed to participate in Miss World 2001, but due to her young age the Miss World officials refused her participation. No runners-up from the Miss Moldova 2001 pageant were sent to Miss World 2001 for the same reason.
  - No contest was held in 2001 due to the Nepalese royal massacre occurring at mid-year.
  - Miss Uzbekistan 2001, Olesya Loshkareva had to cancel her participation due to security reasons following the terrorist September 11 attacks in New York. However Uzbekistan finally made their debut 12 years later, at Miss World 2013.

Replacements
  – Miss Mundo Colombia 2001, Carol de la Torre resigned her crown due to accusations of being married. 
  – Miss Latvia 2001, Gunta Rudzīte was expected to compete in Miss World 2001, but she was replaced by Dina Kalandārova, Miss Latvia 1999–2000, crowned in Tunisia.

Other notes
  – Christina Sawaya was expected to compete at Miss Universe 2002, but boycotted because of the participation of an Israeli delegate. She then participated and won Miss International 2002.
  – Agbani Darego had competed in Miss Universe 2001 6 months prior to Miss World, reaching the top 10.
 - Rebeka Dremelj later represented her country at Eurovision Song Contest 2008 in Belgrade, Serbia, with the song "Vrag naj vzame".

References

External links
 Pageantopolis – Miss World 2001

Miss World
2001 in South Africa
2001 beauty pageants
Beauty pageants in South Africa
November 2001 events in South Africa